Summer and Smoke is a 1961 American drama film directed by Peter Glenville, and starring Laurence Harvey and Geraldine Page, with Rita Moreno, Una Merkel, John McIntire, Thomas Gomez, Pamela Tiffin, Malcolm Atterbury, Lee Patrick, and Earl Holliman. Based on the Tennessee Williams play of the same name, it was adapted by James Poe and Meade Roberts.

Plot

Alma Winemiller is the fragile, lonely, and oversensitive daughter of a minister in a small Mississippi town shortly before the first World War. From childhood she has harbored an almost spiritual love for John Buchanan, who, though a physician like his father, resents being forced to follow in his father's footsteps. But the unruly John prefers livelier company than the timid Alma; in particular, he is attracted by Rosa Zacharias, the tigerish daughter of the owner of Moon Lake Casino. One night, John becomes intrigued by Alma's shy, inhibited gropings toward love, and he takes her to the casino. When he tries to seduce her, the horrified girl hysterically denounces him and runs away. A short time later, the elder Dr. Buchanan is called out of town, and John uses the occasion to throw a wild party celebrating his betrothal to Rosa. Alma frantically telephones Dr. Buchanan, who quickly returns, quarrels with Zacharias, and is accidentally shot and killed. Shattered by the tragedy caused by his carousing, John reforms and takes over his father's practice. As the months pass, Alma's brooding love erupts into passion; and she goes to John and offers herself to him. But it is too late; it is John who now regards their relationship as a spiritual one. After learning that John plans to marry Nellie Ewell, a young girl, the heartbroken and frustrated Alma wanders down to the park. There she strikes up an acquaintance with a lonely traveling salesman, Archie Kramer. When he asks what excitement can be found in the town, Alma smiles at him and suggests they take a taxi to Moon Lake Casino. As they drive off, Alma watches the dying leaves of summer blowing across the pavement (synopsis from AFI Catalog of Feature Films ).

Cast
 Laurence Harvey as John Buchanan, Jr.
 Geraldine Page as Alma Winemiller
 Rita Moreno as Rosa Zacharias
 Una Merkel as Mrs. Winemiller
 John McIntire as Dr. Buchanan
 Thomas Gomez as Papa Zacharias
 Pamela Tiffin as Nellie Ewell
 Malcolm Atterbury as Rev. Winemiller
 Lee Patrick as Mrs. Ewell
 Max Showalter as Roger Doremus (as Casey Adams)
 Earl Holliman as Archie Kramer
 Pepe Hern as Nico

Reception
While Geraldine Page received nearly universal acclaim for her performance, Laurence Harvey was thought by some contemporary reviewers as having been miscast as John Buchanan Jr.

Accolades

The film is recognized by the American Film Institute in these lists:
 2005: AFI's 100 Years of Film Scores – Nominated

References

External links

1961 films
1961 drama films
American drama films
American films based on plays
Films based on works by Tennessee Williams
Films directed by Peter Glenville
Films featuring a Best Drama Actress Golden Globe-winning performance
Films produced by Hal B. Wallis
Films scored by Elmer Bernstein
Films set in Mississippi
Films set in the 1910s
Films with screenplays by James Poe
Paramount Pictures films
Southern Gothic films
1960s English-language films
1960s American films